Incrocci is an Italian surname. Notable people with the surname include:

Agenore Incrocci (1919–2005), Italian screenwriter, brother of Zoe
Zoe Incrocci (1917–2003), Italian actress and voice actress

Italian-language surnames